Thomas, Tom or Tommy Blackburn may refer to:

Anthony Blackburn (born 1945), British vice-admiral and Equerry to the Royal Household, commonly known as Tom Blackburn
Thomas Blackburn (entomologist) (1844–1912), Australian entomologist
Thomas Blackburn (poet) (1916–1977), British poet
Tom Blackburn (basketball) (1906–1964), American basketball coach
Tom Blackburn (pharmacologist) (born 1949), British industrial pharmacologist
Tom W. Blackburn (1913–1992), American writer and lyricist
Tommy Blackburn (1913–1994), American naval aviator and World War II flying ace